Orodes is the Latinized form of a male given name of Middle Iranian origin popularized by Parthians. In Greek it is recorded as Orōdēs, Hērōdēs, Hurōdēs, and once as Ouorōdēs. It is recorded in Shapur I's trilingual inscription at the Ka'ba-ye Zartosht as Greek (§67) Ouorōd, Middle Persian (§35) wyrwd ( Wērōy, Wīroy, Wirōy) and Parthian (§28) wrwd ( Wērōd, Urūd). The older form is probably Wērōd, supposedly developed into a regional Werōd, and later Worōd. It is recorded in New Persian as Wērō ("Viru"), name of a character in Vis o Ramin, a romance of Parthian origin.

The name is recorded as wrwd in Syriac and Aramaic texts from Egypt (spelled wrd instead), Elymais, Palmyra, Hatra, Dura-Europos, and possibly Assur. The Parthian name is also attested in Late Babylonian (mú-ru-da-a).

The etymology of the word is disputed.

See also
Herod
Orodes, list of people bearing the name

References

Iranian masculine given names
Parthia